RR Enriquez (born Romyreen Enriquez on October 19, 1983) is a Filipino model, dancer and television personality. She first became known as one of the dancers on the variety and game show Wowowee. She later became one of its hosts alongside Mariel Rodriguez, Valerie Concepcion and Pokwang. She currently stars on the Filipino comedy show Banana Split on ABS-CBN, together with Angelica Panganiban, Pokwang and others.

Modelling
She is featured on the covers of the June 2009 Filipino editions of FHM.

Filmography

Movies
Status: It's Complicated
Dyagwar
Raketeros

References

1983 births
Participants in Philippine reality television series
Living people
Star Magic
Filipino female models
The Amazing Race contestants